The 2021 ADAC GT4 Germany season is the third season of the ADAC GT4 Germany, a sports car championship created and organised by the ADAC. The season began on 14 May at Oschersleben and ended on 7 November at the Nürburgring.

Calendar
The provisional calendar was announced on the season finale of the 2020 Season. The round at Nürburgring planned in 5-7 August was postponed after massive flooding in Germany. The new date was set to 5-7 November, making its the series finale.

Entry List

See also
2021 GT4 European Series
2021 ADAC GT Masters
2021 French GT4 Cup

References

External links

ADAC GT4 Germany